Steven Anthony Jacobs (born 13 September 1988) is a Guyanese cricketer who plays for the Guyanese national side in West Indian domestic cricket, as well as representing the Guyana Amazon Warriors franchise in the Caribbean Premier League (CPL). He is an all-rounder who bats right-handed and bowls off spin.

Jacobs was born in Georgetown, the capital of Guyana. He played for the West Indies under-19s at the 2008 Under-19 World Cup in Malaysia, as vice-captain to Shamarh Brooks. At the tournament, Jacobs won two man of the match awards – against Papua New Guinea he scored 101 from 86 balls, while against Ireland he took 3/18 and made 40 not out. He had already made his first-class debut before appearing in the World Cup, playing two matches for Guyana in the 2005–06 Carib Beer Cup, aged 17.

During the 2008–09 season, Jacobs played regularly himself in Guyana's four-day and one-day teams, scoring maiden half-centuries in both forms of the game. However, he fell out of the form the following season, and did not regain a regular position until the 2012–13 season. In the 2012–13 Regional Four Day Competition, Jacobs scored 245 runs, placing him behind only Leon Johnson and Assad Fudadin for Guyana, and also took 17 wickets, behind only Veerasammy Permaul and Devendra Bishoo amongst his teammates. He signed with the Amazon Warriors for the inaugural 2013 Caribbean Premier League season, but has only made sporadic appearances for the team.

On 3 June 2018, he was selected to play for the Vancouver Knights in the players' draft for the inaugural edition of the Global T20 Canada tournament.

References

External links
Player profile and statistics at CricketArchive
Player profile and statistics at ESPNcricinfo

1988 births
Living people
Guyana cricketers
Guyanese cricketers
Guyana Amazon Warriors cricketers
Jamaica Tallawahs cricketers
Sportspeople from Georgetown, Guyana